The Peale, located in Baltimore, Maryland, is Baltimore's Community Museum. Its mission is to evolve the role of museums in society by providing local creators and storytellers with the space and support the need to realize a complete and accessible cultural legacy for the city of Baltimore. In August 2022, The Peale held a grand re-opening ceremony after the completion of a five-year restoration process.

The Peale occupies the first building in the Western Hemisphere to be designed and built specifically as a museum. The museum was imagined by American artist and inventor Rembrandt Peale (1778–1860) and designed by architect Robert Cary Long, Sr.

Peale's original museum closed in 1829. The building later served as Baltimore's City Hall from 1830 to 1875 after which it became the Male and Female Colored School No. 1 from 1878 to 1887. The school was one of the first grammar schools and the first high school for African American students in Baltimore.

History
In 1814, artist Rembrandt Peale established The Peale Museum at 225 North Holliday Street between East Saratoga and East Lexington streets in Baltimore. Rembrandt was the second son of artist and museum founder Charles Willson Peale. Rembrandt Peale's museum was dubbed as "Peale's Baltimore Museum and Gallery of Fine Arts" and featured portraits of famous Americans, including some by its founder, as well as the complete skeleton of a prehistoric mastodon exhumed by Charles Willson Peale in 1801. During the Battle of Baltimore a month after opening, Rembrandt Peale, his wife, and seven children spent the night in the museum hoping that the British military would think the museum was their home and spare the building.

The fame of Peale's museum was such that it was occasionally described as simply the "Baltimore Museum." Rembrandt's brother, Rubens Peale, managed the museum until 1829.

Extensive reviews by John Neal of the museum's annual exhibitions in 1822 and 1823 are some of the earliest published works of American art criticism.

The Peale Museum was the first building in Baltimore to have gas lighting.

In 1829, the museum was sold due to financial difficulties and the exhibits were moved to a newly constructed building on the northwest corner of North Calvert Street and East Baltimore Street, one block south of the Battle Monument Square and the Baltimore City Courthouse. From 1830 to 1875,  the museum's former building served as Baltimore's first City Hall.

The building was turned over to the city's Board of School Commissioners and the Baltimore City Public Schools. In 1878, it became the Male and Female Colored School No. 1. The school, which operated until 1887, was one of the first grammar schools and the first high school for African American students in Baltimore.

The Peale building housed the Bureau of Water Supply from 1887 to 1916 and was rented by various shops and factories from 1916 to 1928.

By 1928, the building had been repeatedly condemned and was in danger of demolition. The building was renovated and rededicated in 1931 as the Municipal Museum of Baltimore. The renovation of the building was supervised by John Henry Scarff, a Baltimore-born architect, painter, and archaeologist, who later worked closely on policies governing looted art and damaged monuments during and after World War II.

The building was designated a National Historic Landmark in 1965.

The building underwent a major two-year renovation starting in 1978 and was reopened in 1981 as the Peale Museum. In 1985, The Peale became part of the Baltimore City Life Museums (BCLM), a consortium of historic homes, building and sites. 
 
BCLM folded in 1997 and the entire Peale collection was moved to the Maryland Historical Society, leaving the original building on North Holliday Street vacant until it was reopened for periodic public programs and events in 2017.

In 2014, a campaign was being waged by a Maryland group to raise $4 million for restoration of the museum. The restoration project was completed in 2022 and a grand reopening ceremony took place in August 2022.

See also
 Peale's Barber Farm Mastodon Exhumation Site

References

External links

Peale's American Museum information from the Academy of Natural Sciences

Peale Museum – Explore Baltimore Heritage
, including undated photo, at Maryland Historical Trust

Museums in Baltimore
Art museums and galleries in Maryland
Downtown Baltimore
National Historic Landmarks in Maryland
Infrastructure completed in 1814
Natural history museums in Maryland
Defunct museums in Maryland
Art museums established in 1786
Art museums disestablished in 1997
1786 establishments in Maryland
1997 disestablishments in Maryland
Historic American Buildings Survey in Baltimore
Buildings and structures on the National Register of Historic Places in Baltimore
Peale family
Baltimore City Landmarks